Suman Ramesh Tulsiani may refer to:

Suman Ramesh Tulsiani Technical Campus - Faculty of Engineering, an engineering college in Kamshet, Pune, Maharashtra, India
Shushrusha's Suman Ramesh Tulsiani Hospital, hospital in Vikhroli, Mumbai, India